Colruyt Group is a Belgian family-owned retail corporation that is managing the Colruyt supermarkets and other subsidiaries such as OKay, Bio-Planet, DATS 24, DreamLand, DreamBaby, and more.

Founded in 1928 by Franz Colruyt, the group today is most significantly known for its eponymous discount supermarket chain, which is one of the major players in especially Belgium. Colruyt Group is headquartered in the city of Halle and has operations in Belgium, France and Luxembourg.

Operations 
The group's main business is its Colruyt discount supermarket stores, with over 220 locations in Belgium. The brand competes directly with discount retailers such as Aldi and Lidl. Other food retail brands operated by the company include the grocery store chain OKay and the organic supermarket Bio-Planet. Colruyt is also one of two franchisees of the SPAR brand in Belgium. In France Colruyt operates its eponymous chain and also supplies the Coccinelle chain of supermarkets.

List of subsidiaries 
 Colruyt supermarkets - Belgium
 Colruyt France - supermarkets
 Colruyt Group Services (IT - work simplification - BPM - Marketing - Technics)
 Bio-Planet - Bio (organic) supermarkets
 Colex - Colruyt Export: export of products to Africa, South America, ...
 Collect&Go - online grocery shopping
 ColliShop - e-shop non-food
 Cru - delicacies markets
 DATS 24 - gas stations
 DreamBaby - children (mostly infants) apparel 
 DreamLand - toy and gift shops
 Eoly (sustainable energy supplier)
 OKay - grocery stores
 Retail Partners Colruyt Group (franchising)
 Solucious - wholesale
 Symeta (formerly Druco) - printing company
 ZEB - fashion apparel store

Milestones

 1960: purchase of IBM 360-20 to process the famous punch cards as the first supermarket in Belgium. 
 1960s: start of the lowest prices policy with Discount Verloo.
 1971: opening of  the first unmanned DATS 24-hour filling station in Belgium.
 1987: first company in Belgium to use ‘full scanning’, a barcode on the product to automate replenishment, stock management and orders.
 1990s: food safety in the light of the dioxin affair. the company suggested to draw up specifications with requirements for suppliers, which were later also used by other distributors
 2000: Collect&Go offers Colruyt’s food assortment online.
 2011: pursuit of animal welfare. No more meat from castrated pigs is sold in the group’s stores since early 2011.

References

External links 

Companies based in Flemish Brabant
Companies listed on Euronext Brussels
Supermarkets of Belgium
Belgian brands
Colruyt family